The Artushileike Formation, also rendered A’ertushileike, is located in near the A’ertushileike village in southwestern Xinjiang Uygur Autonomous Region. It is dated to the Early Permian period.

References

Geology of Xinjiang
Geologic formations of China
Permian System of Asia